Alan O. Gowans (January 28, 1899 – June 14, 1965) was an American football and basketball coach. He served as the head football coach at Des Moines University in Des Moines, Iowa from 1926 to 1928 and Macalester College in St. Paul, Minnesota from 1930 to 1936. Gowans was also the head basketball coach at Macalester in 1936–37.

Gowans was a native of Emmetsburg, Iowa. He earned a master's degree at the University of Minnesota. After leaving Macalester, Gowans coached football at Roosevelt High School in Minneapolis. He died of cancer on June 14, 1965, in Minneapolis.

Head coaching record

College football

References

1899 births
1965 deaths
American football guards
Cornell Rams football players
Des Moines Tigers football coaches
Macalester Scots football coaches
Macalester Scots men's basketball coaches
Ottawa Braves football coaches
High school football coaches in Iowa
High school football coaches in Minnesota
University of Minnesota alumni
People from Emmetsburg, Iowa
Coaches of American football from Iowa
Players of American football from Iowa
Basketball coaches from Iowa
Deaths from cancer in Minnesota